Nils Konrad "Kotte" Granström (21 October 1900 – 4 January 1982) was a Swedish gymnast who competed at the 1920 Summer Olympics. He was part of the Swedish team that won the gold medal in the Swedish system event.

References

1900 births
1982 deaths
Swedish male artistic gymnasts
Gymnasts at the 1920 Summer Olympics
Olympic gymnasts of Sweden
Olympic gold medalists for Sweden
Olympic medalists in gymnastics
Medalists at the 1920 Summer Olympics
People from Luleå
Sportspeople from Norrbotten County
20th-century Swedish people